Shaklabad (also Romanized as Shaklābād) is a village in Margavar Rural District, Silvaneh District, Urmia County, West Azerbaijan Province, Iran. At the 2006 census, its population was 437, in 68 families.

References 

Populated places in Urmia County